Ferry de Haan (born 12 September 1972) is a Dutch former professional footballer who has been the general manager of Excelsior Rotterdam since 2012.

Club career
De Haan was born in Capelle aan den IJssel. He played club football for Excelsior Rotterdam and Feyenoord Rotterdam. He won the 1998–99 Eredivisie title with Feyenoord and was a late substitute in the 2002 UEFA Cup Final, in which Feyenoord beat Borussia Dortmund.

Honours
Feyenoord
 Eredivisie: 1998–99
 UEFA Cup: 2001-02

References

External links
 

1972 births
Living people
People from Capelle aan den IJssel
Association football defenders
Dutch footballers
Excelsior Rotterdam players
Feyenoord players
UEFA Cup winning players
Eredivisie players
Eerste Divisie players
Footballers from South Holland